Narden Jaime Espinosa (born August 6, 1971) is a Puerto Rican politician affiliated with the Popular Democratic Party (PPD). He has been a member of the Puerto Rico House of Representatives since 2009 representing District 35.

Early years and studies

Narden Jaime Espinosa was born in Humacao, on August 6, 1971. He is the seventh of ten children. He completed his high school studies at Juan Peña Reyes School in his hometown.

Jaime completed a Bachelor's degree in Business Management, with a major in Marketing, from the University of Turabo.

Professional career

Jaime began his professional career working for the pharmaceutical Bristol-Myers Squibb. He has also worked as a small retailer, opening two cafeterias, which he then sold.

Political career

Jaime's entrance to active politics was as part of the Legislative Assembly of Humacao. He also served as Municipal Secretary of the same town. Jaime has also served as Special Aide to the House of Representatives of Puerto Rico, assigned to the office of Representative Joel Rosario Hernández.

In 2008, he decided to run for Representative for District 35, under the Popular Democratic Party (PPD). He was elected in the general election that year.

Jaime was reelected in 2012.

Personal life

Jaime is married and has two children.

References

External links
Narden Jaime Espinosa Biography on CamaraDeRepresentantes.org
Narden Jaime Espinosa Profile on WAPA-TV

Living people
1971 births
Popular Democratic Party members of the House of Representatives of Puerto Rico
People from Humacao, Puerto Rico